is a collective of Japanese direct-to-video instalments, serving as a standalone sequel to the 1967-68 tokusatsu series Ultraseven. The series took place in an alternate universe featuring Ultraseven diverging from Ultraman and other succeeding Ultra Series starting from Return of Ultraman.

The project initially started as a pair of television specials in the year 1994, made to promote the environmental awareness in Japan. It received a trilogy of specials in 1998 to promote Ultraseven's 30th anniversary and a hexalogy in 1999 to ostensibly wrapping up the entire series. To celebrate the 35th anniversary of Ultraseven, the Evolution pentalogy was introduced in 2002 as a direct follow up to the 1999 hexalogy and became the definitive ending to Heisei Ultraseven.

Synopsis

NTV Duology (1994)
10 years after Ultraseven's fight with Re-Pandon, the Ultra crash-landed on Earth after being injured from the fight against Alien Pitt. At this point, Furuhashi lead a trio of young members in the Ultra Guard in protecting the Earth against invading forces. When the Alien Pitt unleashed their monster Eleking against mankind, Seven was revived after the aliens' assassination attempts went awry. The newly resurrected Seven managed to kill Eleking and the Alien Pitts after freeing their hostage.

At some point of time, the Alien Metron siblings set their sight on Earth to make it as their secondary home. The siblings pose as environmental terrorist to fool a college professor into their aid, going as far as to even clone a massive dinosaur as their supporter. Seven's human form, Dan, returned to assist the new members of Ultra Guard in their investigation, but preferred to hide his presence from Furuhashi. Seven disappeared after the death of Alien Metron and the alien base's destruction seemingly consumed the Ultra in an explosion.

30th Anniversary Memorial Trilogy (1998)
Dan survived the explosion of Alien Metron's base, but this resulted with an amnesia and forced him to take refuge at the Murata family. Meanwhile, Furuhashi has elevated to the rank of TDF staff officer, while a new batch of Ultra Guard members were selected under Captain Sanshiro Shiragane. After regaining his memory, Dan assisted the new Ultra Guard members in their fight against another extraterrestrial threats. In several occasions, Dan tends to masquerade as the UG rookie Kazamori by switching places with the youth. Seven departed from Earth once more after reuniting with Furuhashi for the final time.

The Final Chapters Hexalogy (1999)
Several years later, former Ultra Guard member Kaji was promoted into a TDF staff officer and became a war hawk who proposed the Friendship Plan to annihilate potentially hostile alien planets after losing his teammates in the past. Kaji's actions caused the Alien Valkyrie's invasion on Earth, leading to the death of Furuhashi and forcing Dan/Seven to masquerade as Kazamori for an entire year. Without Furuhashi to supervise, Kaji took the late officer's role and further complicating matters for the Ultra Guard members in their missions against the alien invaders.

When a lone Nonmalt appeared to enact her revenge on mankind, the existence of TDF's Omega File were brought to light as it would threaten mankind's status quo on Earth, due to their predecessors were revealed to be invaders that had overthrow the original natives (Nonmalt) as the planet's dominant species. Nevertheless, Seven chose to dedicate his life in protecting mankind by killing Nonmalt's monster, Zabangi, despite his action was marked as violating the rules of outer space by interfering with a civil war. After returning the real Kazamori to the Ultra Guard, Seven left Earth to face his comeuppance, as he was imprisoned in the Horsehead Nebula for his actions.

Ultraseven Evolution Pentalogy (2002)
Five years after the Omega Files incident, peace returned to Earth after TDF agreed to sign a peace treaty with the outer space civilizations. Although Kazamori had long retired from his service, the Ultra Guard was due to be disbanded due to TDF's arms reduction policy, but a string of incidents caused them to operate once more alongside a new member named Kisaragi, eventually going rogue after discovering TDF had been infested with alien invaders. Kazamori on the other hand face against the threat of Alien Garut, the mastermind behind the secret alien invasion as he and the other invaders plan to conquer Earth by taking control of the Plant Life Form, a race that was supposedly inheritors of Earth's future.

Kazamori bonded with Seven after Satomi's death freed the Ultra from his prison and had protected the Plant Life Form from both aliens and TDF/Ultra Guard members alike. Once discovering that mankind was never forsaken for Earth's future (as well as Alien Garut falsifying the Akashic Record for his own benefit), Kazamori/Seven killed the alien to end his invasion plans. After entrusting the Akashic Record and the Plant Life Form to the Ultra Guard, Kazamori parted ways with his former teammates.

List of instalments

Video works
1994 TV specials

Novel
Both novels are written by Junki Takegami, illustrated by Shinobu Tanno and published by Asahi Sonorama in year 2002.

: Released in May 2002. It served as a compilation of the hexalogy series with slight alteration to the storyline.
: Released in November 2002. In addition to being a novel adaptation of the Evolution pentalogy, it also served as a direct follow-up to the aforementioned Episode: 0 novel.

Production
The project was originally planned to be an animation work, but then-producer of Yomiko Advertising, Toshihiko Fujinami decided to do a different approach. Ultraseven was decided as the icon (due to the hero using solar energy to empower himself), hence the first Heisei Ultraseven, Operation: Solar Energy was broadcast on March 21, 1994 on Nippon TV, exactly on Japan's Vernal Equinox Day. The aforementioned special itself inherited a majority of the filming crew behind Gridman the Hyper Agent, and the same team would eventually work in the production of Ultraman Tiga. The use of Alien Pitt and Eleking, as well as Sandayu Dokumamushi and Yuriko Hishimi's return to their roles as Furuhashi and Anne were due to long time fan's familiarity with Ultraseven. As a result of the special's nature, Kohji Moritsugu could only provide narrative role for the story instead of reprising his role as Dan Moroboshi. Due to Operation: Solar Energy's popularity, another TV special was conceived to coincide with Japan's Health and Sports Day on October 10, 1994. The second special, Planet of the Earthlings, ended with Seven's apparent death. Director Shinichi Kamisawa hoped for a continuation where the Ultra survived, and he got his wish in the following home video series.

Starting from the 1998 trilogy, Dan had grown his hair and changed his outfit under Kohji Moritsugu's demand to be based on his favorite actor, Steven Seagal. According to director Shinichi Kamisawa, the central theme of Ultraseven was "protecting the Earth from extraterrestrial invaders", while the 1998 trilogy was "the coexistence of Earth and mankind". From here onwards, the collaboration with VAP for original video contents was due to their past association with Tsuburaya Productions during the making of Moon Spiral miniseries. With the exception of Kōji Nanjo, actors for the new members of Ultra Guard were carefully selected through an audition of 2,000 candidates. Shigeki Kagemaru was not able to reprise his role as Kaji due to the filming of Ultraman Tiga had already wrapped up by the time the trilogy's filming took place.

Several of the Ultra Guard actors get to be the main focus of certain episodes. The central theme of the hexalogy was "there are enemies within the existence of human beings themselves". Shoji Nakayama, the actor of Kaoru Kiriyama in Ultraseven, was meant to reprise his role in the final instalment of the hexalogy, but the actor died at the same month of the filming (December 1998).

Cast
, narrator: 
: 
: 
: 
: 
: 
: 
: 
: 
:

Semi-regular cast
: 
: 
: 
: 
: 
: 
/: 
:

Guest cast
1994
: 
, : 
: 
: Kyoji Kamui

1999
: 
Journalist (1): 
/ (2): 
: 
Mysterious man (2): Akitoshi Ōtaki
: 
:  (young),  (old)
: 
: 
: 
: 
: 

2002
/ (1): Hiroko Sakurai
:

Theme song
TV Special and 1998 trilogy

Lyrics: 
Arrangement & Composition: 
Artist: , 
"Version 2" is played as the ending theme.

1999 hexalogy
Opening: 
Lyrics: Kyōichi Azuma
Arrangement & Composition: Tōru Fuyuki
Artist: 
A remix version is played as the opening of the 2002 Evolution Pentalogy.
Ending: 
Arrangement & Composition: Tōru Fuyuki
Artist & Lyrics: Isao Sasaki

2002 Evolution Pentalogy
Ending: ULTRA SEVEN 99
Lyrics: Kyōichi Azuma
Arrangement & Composition: Tōru Fuyuki
Artist: Isao Sasaki

Notes

References

Printed references

External links

Ultra Series films
Ultra Seven
2000s Japanese-language films
1998 direct-to-video films
1999 direct-to-video films
1999 films
2002 direct-to-video films
2002 films
Environmental films
Genocide in fiction
Nippon TV original programming
Tokusatsu television series
Racism in fiction
1990s Japanese films
2000s Japanese films